John Wesley Gaines (August 24, 1860 – July 4, 1926) was an American politician and a member of the United States House of Representatives for the 6th congressional district of Tennessee.

Biography
Gaines was born in Wrecoe, near Nashville, Tennessee in Davidson County, son of John and Maria Wair Gaines.  He attended private and public schools, in which he also taught. He studied law at home, studied medicine, and graduated from the University of Nashville. He graduated from the Vanderbilt University in Nashville, Tennessee in 1882. He never practiced medicine, but the day after graduation he resumed the study of law. He was admitted to the bar in 1884 and commenced practice in Nashville in 1885.

Career
Elected as a Democrat to the Fifty-fifth and the five succeeding Congresses, Gaines served from March 4, 1897 to March 3, 1909.  He was an unsuccessful candidate for re-election in 1908 to the Sixty-first Congress. He continued to practice law in Nashville, Tennessee.

Death
On July 4, 1926 (age 65 years, 314 days), Gaines died in Nashville. He is interred at Mount Olivet Cemetery.

References

External links
 

 

1860 births
1926 deaths
People from Nashville, Tennessee
Vanderbilt University alumni
Democratic Party members of the United States House of Representatives from Tennessee
Politicians from Nashville, Tennessee